Berezovka is a rural locality (a settlement) in Karamyshevsky Selsoviet, Zmeinogorsky District, Altai Krai, Russia. The population was 181 as of 2013. There are 3 streets.

Geography 
Berezovka is located 10 km west of Zmeinogorsk (the district's administrative centre) by road. Karamyshevo is the nearest rural locality.

References 

Rural localities in Zmeinogorsky District